Henry Nielsen may refer to:

 Henry Nielsen (actor) (1890–1967), Danish stage and film actor 
 Henry Nielsen (athlete) (1910–1969), Danish middle- and long-distance runner
 Henry Nielsen (footballer)